Gravberget Church is a parish church of the Church of Norway in Våler Municipality in Innlandet county, Norway. It is located in the village of Gravberget. It is the church for the Gravberget parish which is part of the Solør, Vinger og Odal prosti (deanery) in the Diocese of Hamar. The brown, wooden church was built in a fan-shaped design in 1955 using plans drawn up by the architect Magnus Poulsson. The church seats about 150 people.

History

During the 1950s, the parish decided to build a church in the Finnskogen forest area in eastern Våler. In 1952, Magnus Poulsson was hired to design the new church. The church design is reminiscent of the shape of a spruce tree. The base is almost square, and the tower superstructure is pyramid-shaped. The tower above the roof is set diagonally in relation to the building itself. It thus becomes a pyramid diagonally above the pyramid. The church was built in 1955 and it was consecrated on 30 October 1955 by the Bishop Kristian Schjelderup.

See also
List of churches in Hamar

References

Våler, Innlandet
Churches in Innlandet
Fan-shaped churches in Norway
Wooden churches in Norway
20th-century Church of Norway church buildings
Churches completed in 1955
1955 establishments in Norway